Martin Klinger (born 9 July 1980) is an Ecuadorian retired footballer who played as a defender.

Early and personal life
He was born in Cuenca. His older brother Fausto Klinger was also a footballer.

Career
He spent two seasons in Major League Soccer with the MetroStars.

References

1980 births
Living people
People from Cuenca, Ecuador
Ecuadorian footballers
New York Red Bulls players
New York Red Bulls draft picks
Major League Soccer players
Association football forwards
Ecuadorian expatriate footballers
Ecuadorian expatriate sportspeople in the United States
Expatriate soccer players in the United States